The Little Cowboy (originally titled Küçük Kovboy) is a 1973 Turkish western film, directed by Guido Zurli, starring Cüneyt Arkın.

Plot
Yumurcak lives in a village in the wild west. On his way from school, he is kidnapped by the bandit Demirbilek and his gang. They ask his mom, Maureen for ransom money. Maureen seeks for help and finds Keskin. Keskin is a very sharp shooter, yet since he has caused the death of a child many years ago, he has been inactive for years.

Selected cast 
 Cüneyt Arkın as Keskin
 İlker İnanoğlu as Yumurcak
 Pascale Petit as Maureen
 Sergio Ciani as Demirbilek
 Evelyn Stewart as Yumurcak's Mother

External links
 

1973 films
1973 Western (genre) films
1973 multilingual films
1970s children's adventure films
1970s vigilante films
Films about kidnapping
Films set in Turkey
Films shot in Turkey
1970s Turkish-language films
Turkish Western (genre) films
Turkish multilingual films
Italian multilingual films
Turkish vigilante films
Turkish films about revenge
1970s Italian-language films
Spaghetti Western films
1970s Italian films